The Vienna Boys' Choir is a choir of boy sopranos and altos based in Vienna, Austria. It is one of the best known boys' choirs in the world. The boys are selected mainly from Austria, but also from many other countries.

The choir is a private, non-profit organization. There are approximately 100 choristers between the ages of nine and fourteen. The boys are divided into four touring choirs, named after Austrian composers Bruckner, Haydn, Mozart and Schubert, which combined perform about 300 concerts each year before almost 500,000 people. Each group tours for about nine to eleven weeks. Some pieces include "Good Morning" and "Merry Christmas from Vienna Boys".

Early history

The choir is the modern-day descendant of the boys' choirs of the Viennese Court, dating back to the late Middle Ages. The Wiener Hofmusikkapelle was established by a letter from Emperor Maximilian I of the Holy Roman Empire on 30 June 1498, instructing court officials to employ a singing master, two basses and six boys. Jurij Slatkonja became the director of the ensemble. The role of the choir (numbering between 24 and 26) was to provide musical accompaniment for the church mass. Additionally, the Haydn brothers were members of the St. Stephen's Cathedral choir, directed at the time by Georg Reutter II, who used this choir in his duties for the imperial court, which at the time had no boy choristers of its own.

Over the centuries, the choir has worked with many composers, including Heinrich Isaac, Hofhaimer, Biber, Fux, Caldara, Gluck, Salieri, Mozart, Franz Schubert and Bruckner.

In 1920, following the fall of the Austrian Empire, the Hofkapelle (court orchestra) was disbanded. However, the rector at the time, Josef Schnitt, sought a continuation of the tradition. In 1924, the Vienna Boys' Choir was officially founded, and it has evolved into a professional music group. The choir adopted the now-famous blue-and-white sailor suit, replacing the imperial military cadet uniform that included a dagger. The composer HK Gruber is one of the graduates of the reformed choir. 

Since 1948, Palais Augarten has served as the rehearsal venue and boarding school, which goes from kindergarten level up to middle school level.

In 1961, Walt Disney filmed Almost Angels, a fictional drama about (and starring) the Vienna Boys' Choir, set and filmed in the Palais Augarten. It was Disney who, for cinematographic reasons, persuaded the Austrian government to allow the boys to legally wear the Austrian national emblem on the breast of their uniform, a tradition that continues to this day.

Recent history

Gerald Wirth became the choir's artistic director in 2001. However, since then, the choir has come under pressure to modernize and has faced criticism of their musical standards, leading to a split with the Vienna State Opera. The choir has for the first time had to advertise for recruits after a rival choir school was established by Ioan Holender, director of the opera company. He complained of both falling standards and poor communication with the choir. He said that the State Opera sometimes trained boys for particular stage roles, only to find out on the day of performance that they were unavailable as they had gone on tour with the choir. Some boys were attracted to the rival choir school by the prospect of a more relaxed atmosphere and of performance fees being paid directly to them.

The Vienna Boys' Choir has sought to update its image, recording pop music selections and adopting an alternative uniform to the sailor suits used since the 1920s, allowing the boys to dance as they sing. After Eugen Jesser died in May 2008, Walter Nettig became the choir's president. Gerald Wirth has been the artistic director since 2001, and he also became the choir's president in 2013.

In 2010, following sexual abuse allegations from two former choristers stemming from the late 1960s and early 1980s, the Vienna Boys' Choir opened a confidential phone and e-mail hotline to allow others to come forward. Eight possible victims came forward saying they were abused, either by staff or other choir members.

Selected discography

Christmas
Frohe Weihnachten (2015)
Wiener Sängerknaben Goes Christmas (2003)
Frohe Weihnacht (Merry Christmas) (1999)
Christmas in Vienna / Heiligste Nacht (1990)
Merry Christmas from the Vienna Choir Boys (1982)
Christmas with the Vienna Choir Boys (with Hermann Prey)
Christmas with the Vienna Boys' Choir, London Symphony Orchestra (1990)
Weihnacht mit den Wiener Sängerknaben (Hans Gillesberger 1980)
The Little Drummer Boy (TV 1968)
Die Wiener Sängerknaben und ihre Schönsten ... (1967)
Frohe Weihnacht (1960)
Christmas Angels (RCA Gold Seal)
Silent Night

Pop music
I Am from Austria (2006)
Wiener Sängerknaben Goes Pop (2002)

Other recordings
Orff: Carmina Burana (with André Previn and the Vienna Philharmonic Orchestra) (1994)
Angelic Voices (1998)
 "Doraemon no Uta" for the animated motion picture Doraemon: Nobita and the Legend of the Sun King (2000)
 Silk Road: Songs Along the Road and Time (Music from the Motion Picture) (with Yulduz Usmanova and Nursultan Saroy) (2008)
 LG G2 Theme song and ringtone (2013)
 Strauss For Ever (2018)

The Vienna Boys' Choir performed the song "The Little Drummer Boy" in the Rankin/Bass TV special of the same name.

Feature films
 Kleine große Stimme (Little big voice) (2015)
 Songs for Mary (2014)
 Bridging the Gap (2013)
 Silk Road (2008)
 Almost Angels (1962)
 When the Bells Sound Clearly (1959)
 Der schönste Tag meines Lebens (The best day of my life) (1957)
 Voices of Spring (1952)
 Singende Engel (The singing angels) (1947)
 Boys of the Prater (1946)
 Concert in Tirol (1938)
 An Orphan Boy of Vienna (1936)

Featured composers
Johann Sebastian Bach
Ludwig van Beethoven
Heinrich Ignaz Franz Biber
Benjamin Britten
Anton Bruckner
Antonio Caldara
Jacobus Gallus
George Frideric Handel
Joseph Haydn
Wolfgang Amadeus Mozart
Franz Schubert
Salomon Sulzer

Smaller works based on anthologies

Anton Bruckner, Christus factus est
Anton Bruckner, Locus iste
Anton Bruckner, Os justi
Anton Bruckner, Virga Jesse
Joseph Leopold Eybler, Omnes de Saba venient
Gabriel Fauré, Pie Jesu
Jacobus Gallus, Natus est nobis
Jacobus Gallus, Pueri concinite
Jacobus Gallus, Repleti sunt
Georg Friedrich Händel, Zadok the Priest
Joseph Haydn, Du bist's, dem Ruhm und Ehre gebühret
Joseph Haydn, Insanae et vanae curae
Michael Haydn, Lauft, ihr Hirten allzugleich
Jacbus de Kerle, Sanctus – Hosanna – Benedictus
Wolfgang Amadeus Mozart, Kyrie Es-Dur KV 322
Wolfgang Amadeus Mozart, Kyrie d-moll KV 341
Wolfgang Amadeus Mozart, Misericordias Domini KV 222
Wolfgang Amadeus Mozart, Sub tuum praesidium
Giovanni Nascus, Incipit lamentatio
Giovanni Pierluigi da Palestrina, Hodie Christus natus est
Michael Praetorius, In natali Domini
Franz Schubert, Salve Regina D 386
Franz Schubert, Tantum ergo D 962
Franz Schubert, Totus in corde langueo D 136
Giuseppe Verdi, Laudi alla Vergine Maria
Giuseppe Verdi, Pater noster
Tomás Luis de Victoria, O regem coeli
Tomás Luis de Victoria, Una hora

See also

Vienna Girls' Choir
Drakensberg Boys' Choir School

References

External links

 
 School's official website 
 Friends of the Vienna Boys Choir
 
 

1490s establishments in the Holy Roman Empire
1498 establishments in Europe
15th-century establishments in Austria
Austrian choirs
Boys' and men's choirs
Choirs of children
Musical groups from Vienna
Musical groups established in the 15th century
Organisations based in Vienna
EMI Classics and Virgin Classics artists